Pimple Creek is a stream in Taylor County, Florida, in the United States.

Pimple Creek formed a boundary of Perry, Florida when Perry was incorporated in 1905.

See also
List of rivers of Florida

References

Rivers of Taylor County, Florida
Rivers of Florida